Ned Lawrence Siegel (born September 26, 1951) is a lawyer, real estate businessman and a former American ambassador to the Bahamas (2007–2009).

Siegel graduated from the University of Connecticut in 1973 and received a Juris Doctor from the Dickinson School of Law in 1976.

Career
Siegel clerked for Chief Justice Mitchell H. Cohen in the Federal District Court in Camden, New Jersey before joining the New Jersey law firm of Kimmelman, Wolff & Samson.

Siegel joined The Howard Siegel Companies in 1977, a developer of residential properties.  By 1980, he was named president and managing partner of the Weingarten-Siegel Group, Inc. In 1997, he founded The Siegel Group.

In 2006, Siegel was appointed Representative of the United States to the United Nations (2006–2007).

In June 2014, Siegel was named Of Counsel to Wildes & Weinberg, P.C.

References

1951 births
Ambassadors of the United States to the Bahamas
American company founders
20th-century American Jews
American officials of the United Nations
Dickinson School of Law alumni
Living people
New Jersey lawyers
University of Connecticut alumni
United Nations officials
American business executives
American real estate businesspeople
21st-century American Jews